is a Japanese paralympic badminton player. She competed at the 2020 Summer Paralympics in the badminton competition, winning the bronze medal in the women's doubles SL3–SU5 event with her teammate, Ayako Suzuki.

Achievements

Paralympic Games 
Women's doubles

World Championships 

Women's doubles

Asian Para Games 
Women's doubles

BWF Para Badminton World Circuit (1 title, 1 runner-up) 
The BWF Para Badminton World Circuit – Grade 2, Level 1, 2 and 3 tournaments has been sanctioned by the Badminton World Federation from 2022.

Mixed doubles

International Tournaments (3 titles, 7 runners-up) 
Women's singles

Women's doubles

References

Notes 

Living people
Japanese female badminton players
Paralympic badminton players of Japan
Paralympic bronze medalists for Japan
Paralympic medalists in badminton
Badminton players at the 2020 Summer Paralympics
Medalists at the 2020 Summer Paralympics
21st-century Japanese women
1976 births